John Warren (1916–1977) was the stage and pen name of a British screenwriter and support actor. Specialising in comedy writing, he worked with several figures at the forefront of British comedy, such as Tommy Cooper, Peter Sellers, Dick Emery and Mike and Bernie Winters.

He had several screenwriting projects with film director Val Guest whom he first encountered as an actor in 1948.

Life

He was born John (Jack) Warner in England on 13 November 1916.

In the Second World War he served in the Royal Navy. Following discharge he pursued a career in films but only served in minor roles. He did however make many contacts and moved into scriptwriting in the late 50s, having considerably more success in this field.

He died on 9 February 1977 in Kingston upon Thames.

Film Scripts

Up The Creek (1958)
Further Up the Creek (1959)
Two-Way Stretch (1960)
Life is a Circus (1960)
Operation Snatch (1962)
The Wrong Arm of the Law (1963)
Rotten to the Core (1965)
Ooh… You Are Awful (1972)

TV Show Scripts
Dave's Kingdom (1964)
Fire Crackers (two episodes, 1965)
Cooperama (1966) a showcase for Tommy Cooper
Mike and Bernie's Show (1966) comedy showcase for Mike and Bernie Winters
Life With Cooper (1966–1968) long-running showcase for Tommy Cooper
The Stanley Baxter Show (one episode 1968) long-running showcase for Stanley Baxter
As Good Cooks Go (seven episodes, 1969–70)
Bernie (1878–1980) a series centred upon Bernie Winters
The Dick Emery Show multiple scripts from 1963 to 1977
It's Lulu (one episode, 1973) long-running showcase for Lulu
The Dick Emery Christmas Show (1974)
Dick Whittington TV movie (1972)
Sacha's In Town (two episodes, 1972) showcase for Sacha Distel
A Christmas Night to Remember, annual show broadcast in UK on Christmas Day - 1963, 1970 and 1971
From a Bird's Eye View (one episode, 1970)

Film Roles
A very frequent actor in support roles Warren was a well-known face but not a well-known name (and often went uncredited). His need to choose a new name stemmed from the pre-existence of the actor Jack Warner who was operating out of the same studios.

When the Bough Breaks (1947) guest at party (uncredited)
The Mark of Cain (1947) as Mr Wilkins (uncredited)
One Night With You (1948) as ticket collector
My Brother's Keeper (1948) as motorist at Nora's Garage (uncredited)
Mr. Perrin and Mr. Traill (1948) as chauffeur
William Comes to Town (1948) as circus official
Warning to Wantons (1949) (uncredited)
It's Not Cricket (1949) as orderly
Marry Me! (1949) as newspaper reporter (uncredited)
Up for the Cup (1950) as Cartwright
Traveller's Joy (1950) as embassy manager (uncredited)
Seven Days to Noon (1950) (uncredited)
Shadow of the Past (1950) as furniture man
The Reluctant Widow (1950)
The Astonished Heart (1950) as barman
Boys in Brown (1949) signalman (uncredited)
A Case of Poisoning (1949) as the butcher
Diamond City (1949) as the town crier
The Franchise Affair (1951) as Charlie the pub landlord
Laughter in Paradise (1951) as card player (uncredited)
A Case for PC 49 (1951) as Coffee Dan
High Treason (1951) as barman (uncredited)
Encore (1951) as ship's officer in "Winter's Cruise" section
Mr. Denning Drives North (1951) as Mr Ash
Stolen Face (1952) as railway guard
Gift Horse (1952) as man in crowd (uncredited)
The Lost Hours (1952) as man with dog
Made in Heaven (1952) as Keeper of the Wheel (uncredited)
The Net (1953) as Ted (uncredited)
Top of the Form (1953) as bookie (uncredited)
Glad Tidings (1953) as barman
Personal Affair (1953) as man in news room (uncredited)
Meet Mr. Lucifer (1953) as man with hammer (uncredited)
36 Hours (1953) as clerk (uncredited)
Trouble in Store (1953) as Master of Ceremonies (uncredited)
Stryker of the Yard (1953)
Hell Below Zero (1954) as hotel receptionist
Fast and Loose (1954) as chauffeur
Up to His Neck (1954) as Collins
To Dorothy a Son (1954) as waiter (uncredited)
Police Dog (1955) as Clerk of Works
Passage Home (1955) as Cook
One Good Turn (1955) as ticket collector (with Norman Wisdom)
Bride of the Monster (1955) as Jake
The Woman for Joe (1955) as workman in pub (uncredited)
Secret Venture (1955) as bargee (uncredited)
Portrait of Alison (1955) as postman (uncredited)
Private's Progress as Sgt Major Gradwick
Jumping for Joy (1956) as commentator at racetrack (uncredited)
The Feminine Touch (1956) (uncredited)
The Iron Petticoat (1956) as airport official (uncredited)
Eyewitness (1956) as Joe the barman at British Legion (uncredited)
The Last Man to Hang (1956) as passport official (uncredited)
The Battle of the River Plate (1956) as chief signalman on HMS Exeter (uncredited)
Brothers in Law (1957) as Mr Venner
A Night To Remember (1958) as crewman on Titanic (uncredited)
Up the Creek (1958) as Cooky
Further Up the Creek (1959) as Cooky
Free Love Confidential (1970)

TV roles

She Stoops to Conquer (1949 TV movie) as Stingo and Jeremy
Stryker of the Yard (1961)
Homicide (1967) as Sikorski

References

1916 births
1977 deaths
British actors
British male screenwriters
20th-century British screenwriters
Royal Navy personnel of World War II